The Church of San Esteban (Spanish: Iglesia Parroquial de San Esteban) is a church located in Ábalos, La Rioja, Spain. It was declared Bien de Interés Cultural in 1973.

References 

Bien de Interés Cultural landmarks in La Rioja (Spain)
Churches in La Rioja (Spain)